Allan Cole (born 14 October 1950), often called "Skill" for short, is a Jamaican former footballer who played at both professional and international levels as striker.

Career
Cole played in the NASL with the Atlanta Chiefs, and in Brazil with Náutico.

He also represented the Jamaica national team at international level. appearing in three FIFA World Cup qualifying matches for them. During his career, he was Jamaica's "most celebrated player".

Music
In addition to his football career, Cole was also the tour manager of the Jamaican reggae star Bob Marley and his band The Wailers during the 1970s. He was credited as co-writing the 1976 song "War".

References

Living people
1950 births
Jamaican footballers
Jamaican expatriate footballers
Jamaica international footballers
Atlanta Chiefs players
Clube Náutico Capibaribe players
Santos F.C. (Jamaica) players
Association football forwards
Sportspeople from Kingston, Jamaica
North American Soccer League (1968–1984) players
Bob Marley and the Wailers
Expatriate soccer players in the United States
Jamaican expatriate sportspeople in the United States
Expatriate footballers in Brazil
Jamaican expatriate sportspeople in Brazil